This is a list of notable University of Portland alumni. The University of Portland is a private, Roman Catholic university located in north Portland, Oregon, along the east bank of the Willamette River. Founded in 1901 by the Congregation of Holy Cross, its sister school is the University of Notre Dame. , the University of Portland counts approximately 13,000 alumni in the Portland metropolitan area alone.

Academia
Jules Boykoff, professor of politics at Pacific University
Robert E. Glennen, 13th president of Emporia State University
John Henry Merryman, Nelson Bowman Sweitzer and Marie B. Sweitzer Professor of Law at Stanford Law School
Michael Merzenich, neuroscientist and Professor at the University of California, San Francisco

Art and literature
Jean M. Auel, author

Civil society
Walter "Walt" Dawson, national spokesperson for the Alzheimer's Association
Edward Kelly, bishop of Boise
Mel White, clergyman and writer on LGBT Christian issues

Entertainment

Film, television, and performing arts
Malika Andrews, journalist for ESPN
Kunal Nayyar, actor, CBS's The Big Bang Theory
Chris Siegfried, reality TV star, season 9 winner of ABC's The Bachelorette
Paul Winfield, actor

Social media
Sean Fujiyoshi, social media personality, YouTube star
Tori Dunlap, founder of Her First $100K, TikTok star
Noah Beck, social media personality, TikTok star

Government and politics

United States congress

U.S. Representatives
Larry LaRocco, former U.S. Representative

Judges
Edward Leavy, judge for the United States Court of Appeals for the Ninth Circuit
George Van Hoomissen, former justice on the Oregon Supreme Court

Other U.S. political figures
Ed Murray, former Mayor of Seattle 2014-17
Nadine Woodward, journalist and Mayor of Spokane, Washington 2019-
Joseph Ada, former Governor of Guam

Science and technology
Chris Lattner, primary author of LLVM software compiler architecture and the Swift programming language
Muriel Lezak, neuropsychologist
Donald Shiley, co-inventor of the artificial heart valve

Sports
Yari Allnutt, U.S. men's international soccer player
Greg Anthony, former NBA basketball player (attended; transferred to UNLV)
Benjamin Benditson, professional soccer player
Chris Brown, soccer player for the Portland Timbers
Conor Casey, U.S. men's international soccer player
Pat Casey, current head coach of the Oregon State baseball team.
Steve Cherundolo, U.S. men's international soccer player
Darwin Cook, former NBA player
Michelle Cruz, professional soccer player for Apollon Limassol and Seattle Reign FC
Ken Dayley, former Major League Baseball pitcher, played in both the 1985 and 1987 World Series
Danielle Foxhoven, NWSL forward for the Portland Thorns FC and Seattle Reign FC
Amanda Frisbie, NWSL forward and defender for Seattle Reign FC
Rocky Gale, Major League Baseball catcher, San Diego Padres
Tyler Glasnow, Major League Baseball pitcher, Tampa Bay Rays
Alfredo Razon Gonzalez, Philippine Men's international soccer player
Kelly Gray, international soccer player
Pinhas Hozez (born 1957), Israeli basketball player, Israeli Basketball Premier League
Eric Hull, former Major League Baseball pitcher
Cooper Hummel, Major League Baseball outfielder, Seattle Mariners
Nate Jaqua, international soccer player
Kasey Keller, U.S. men's international soccer player
Woody Kincaid, U.S. long distance runner
Bill Krueger, former Major League Baseball pitcher
Tom Lampkin, former Major League Baseball catcher
Shannon MacMillan, U.S. women's international soccer player, Olympic Gold Medalist, 1996 Olympics
Tiffeny Milbrett, U.S. women's international soccer player, Olympic Gold Medalist, 1996 Olympics.
Heath Pearce, international soccer player
Cincy Powell, former NBA basketball player
Adam Quick, international basketball player
Megan Rapinoe, U.S. women's international soccer player
Elli Reed, NWSL defender for the Seattle Reign FC
Luis Robles, MLS Goalkeeper for the New York Red Bulls 
Alejandro Salazar, international soccer player
Sophie Schmidt, Canadian internationalsoccer player
Ray Scott, former NBA basketball player
Christine Sinclair, Canadian international soccer player
Jose Slaughter, former NBA player
Robin Smeulders, international basketball player
Garrett Smith, head coach of the women's soccer team
Erik Spoelstra, Miami Heat head coach
Jim Sweeney, former college football head coach
Tomomi "Jumbo" Tsuruta, Japanese former pro wrestler; former training instructor
Keelin Winters, NWSL midfielder for the Seattle Reign FC

Miscellaneous
Rachael Rapinoe, CEO of Mendi, former University of Portland soccer player, sister of USWNT player Megan Rapinoe.
Santiago Ventura Morales, social worker falsely convicted of murder, awarded full scholarship while in prison
Richard VanGrunsven, founder of Aircraft Kit Industry Association, inducted into the Oregon Aviation Hall of Fame

References

University of Portland

University of Portland alumni